Sean Sullivan (December 21, 1921 - June 3, 1985) was a Canadian actor. He is most noted for his stage and television performances in productions of David French's play Of the Fields, Lately, for which he won an ACTRA Award in 1977 as Best Television Actor for the CBC Television film; and his film performances in Springhill, for which he won a Canadian Film Award as Best Actor in a Non-Feature Film in 1972, and The Boy in Blue, for which he received a posthumous Genie Award nomination for Best Supporting Actor at the 7th Genie Awards in 1986.

Born and raised in Toronto, Ontario, he began his career as an actor when a stage play he appeared in in his 20s, Golden Boy, reached the finals of the Dominion Drama Festival. He soon began appearing in CBC Television productions, including episodes of the drama anthology series Playbill, CBC Summer Theatre, Folio and General Motors Theatre. His film roles included Nobody Waved Good-bye, The Young Ones, Why Rock the Boat?, 125 Rooms of Comfort, One Man, The Silent Partner, Atlantic City and The Grey Fox.

Partial filmography

Here Will I Nest (1942) - Col. Thomas Talbot
A Dangerous Age (1957) - Police Officer
During One Night (1960) - Major
The Long Shadow (1961) - Burgen
The Young Ones (1961) - Eddie
Gang War (1962) - Al Hodges
Nobody Waved Good-bye (1964) - Probation Officer
Adulterous Affair (1966) - Frank
Do Not Fold, Staple, Spindle or Mutilate (1967)
2001: A Space Odyssey (1968) - Dr. Bill Michaels
Change of Mind (1969) - Mr. Robinson
Flick (1970) - Prof. Preston
Face-Off (1971) - Greg Walsh
The Sloane Affair (1972)
Pinocchio's Birthday Party (1973) - Giapetto
Why Rock the Boat? (1974) - Herb Scannell
125 Rooms of Comfort (1974) - Jack
Of the Fields, Lately (1976) - Jacob Mercer
Deadly Harvest (1977) - Dr. George Abbott
One Man (1977) - Rodney Porter
The Silent Partner (1978) - Frank, Bank Guard
Nothing Personal (1980) - Dean Collier
Atlantic City (1980) - Buddy
Silence of the North (1981) - Tattered Man
The Grey Fox (1982) - Newspaper Editor
The Dead Zone (1983) - Herb Smith
Best Revenge (1984) - Paperman
Heavenly Bodies (1984) - Real Estate Salesman
Mrs. Soffel (1984) - Farmer
The Boy in Blue (1986) - Walter (final film role)

References

External links

1921 births
1985 deaths
Canadian male film actors
Canadian male television actors
Canadian male stage actors
Male actors from Toronto
Canadian Screen Award winners